The Africa Movie Academy Award for Best Actor in a Supporting role is an annual merit by the Africa Film Academy to recognize and reward actors in a supporting role in a film.

References

Lists of award winners
Film awards for supporting actor
Best Supporting Actor Africa Movie Academy Award winners
Africa Movie Academy Awards